Mark Taylor (born 16 December 1977) is a British former racing driver who drove in the Indy Racing League IndyCar Series. He drove in the 2004 season for two different teams.

Taylor began racing in Formula Ford in his native Britain, winning the 1997 Winter Championship. He finished 8th in the main championship in 1999 while also finishing 4th in European Formula Ford that year. He won the 2000 European championship and was also runner-up in the British championship.

Taylor moved to the British Formula Three Championship in 2001 and finished 9th. The following year he captured his first win and finished 7th in points.

In 2003 Taylor moved to the American Infiniti Pro Series. He dominated the field, winning 7 of the 12 races in the season driving the #4 car for the Fulmar Panther team. He graduated to the IndyCar Series driving the #2 for Team Menard in 2004. However, while showing good speed, particularly in qualifying, he struggled to adapt to the top series. He was involved in accidents in five of his six starts (including the Indy 500) before he was dropped in favor of Townsend Bell.

After missing only one race, he was drafted by Greg Ray's Access Motorsports to drive the #13 car. He was unable to repeat his qualifying performances from earlier in the season but showed maturity in the car to finish 7 of his 9 races for Access with a best finish of 7th place.

Racing record

Complete American Open Wheel Racing results
(key)

Infiniti Pro Series

IRL IndyCar Series

References

External links
Mark Taylor IndyCar and Indy Pro Series stats at ChampCarStats.com
Mark Taylor career summary on Driver Database

1977 births
Living people
English racing drivers
IndyCar Series drivers
Indianapolis 500 drivers
Indy Lights champions
Indy Lights drivers
British Formula Three Championship drivers
Formula Ford drivers
Porsche Supercup drivers
Manor Motorsport drivers
Panther Racing drivers